Owsley is a surname. Notable people with the surname include:

 Alvin M. Owsley (1888–1967), American diplomat
 Augustus Owsley Stanley (1867–1958), Kentucky politician; campaigned against alcohol prohibition in the 1920s; grandfather of Owsley/Bear; descendant of William Owsley
 Augustus Owsley Stanley III (1935–2011), better known as Owsley Stanley, American audio engineer and clandestine chemist
 Bryan Owsley (1798–1849), Kentucky politician
 Charles Henry Owsley (1846–1935), English-born American architect
 Douglas W. Owsley (born 1951), forensic anthropologist and Division Head of Physical Anthropology at the Smithsonian Institution's National Museum of Natural History
 Frank Lawrence Owsley (1890–1956), American historian
 Henry Furlow Owsley III, American investment banker
 Jack Owsley (1883–1953), American football player, coach and businessman
 Lily Owsley (born 1994), English field hockey player
 Monroe Owsley (1900–1937), American actor
 Perry L. Owsley (1915–1979), American judge
 William Owsley (1782–1862), Kentucky politician, ancestor of Augustus Owsley Stanley and his grandson, Owsley Stanley/Bear
 William Owsley (Montana politician) (1842–1919), American politician

Welsh-language surnames